The necessitative mood (abbreviated ) is a grammatical mood found in Turkish and Armenian, which combines elements of both the cohortative (which is typically used in only the first person) and the jussive moods (which is typically only used in the first and third persons).  It expresses plea, insistence, imploring, self-encouragement, wish, desire, intent, command, purpose or consequence.

Examples of the necessitative in Turkish:
 Turkish: Bakmalıyım (I must look); bakmamalısınız (you (pl). should not look); gitmeliyiz (we have to go/we need to go)

Both Eastern and Western Armenian have a past and a non-past necessitative. Eastern Armenian forms its necessitative by adding the particle պիտի piti before the optative forms, while Western Armenian forms its necessitative with the lu future participle plus the forms of әllal (to be).

The Eastern particle piti is orthographically identical to the Western particle bidi, which is used to form the future indicative and conditional. In turn, the Western necessitative forms correspond to Eastern future indicative and future perfect.

References

Grammatical moods